Marat Vazykhovich Kabayev (born 27 May 1961) is an Uzbekistani professional football coach and  former football player.

Personal life 
Kabayev was born in Tatar family. He is a Muslim and is the president of The International Association of Islamic Business. He is the father of the retired rhythmic gymnast and politician Alina Kabayeva.

Playing career
Kabayev started his career in 1979 at Avtomobilist Termez. In 1980, he moved to Pakhtakor. On 28 September 1980, he made his debut for Pakhtakor in a match against Karpaty Lviv. In 1986, he played for SKA Rostov-on-Don and one year later moved back to Pakhtakor and became top goalscorer of the club in 1987 season. He finished his playing career in 1997.

Managerial career
After finishing his playing, Kabayev began a managerial career. In 2004–2005, he was assistant coach at Traktor Tashkent. In 2009, he was appointed as head coach of the Uzbekistan U-18 team. In the 2010 AFC U-19 Championship, the Uzbekistan U-19 team reached the quarter-finals, losing to Saudi Arabia U-19 by 1–2 in extra time.

In 2011, Kabayev was appointed as head coach of Qizilqum Zarafshon. Since 2012, he works at Rubin Kazan as a scout coach.

Honours
Dnipro
 Soviet Top League runner-up: 1989

Pakhtakor
 Soviet First League runner-up: 1990

Navbahor
 Uzbek Cup: 1995

References

External links

 Career summary by KLISF

1961 births
Living people
Volga Tatars
Tatar people of Russia
Tatar sportspeople
People from Surxondaryo Region
Soviet footballers
Uzbekistani Muslims
Uzbekistani footballers
Uzbekistani expatriate footballers
Expatriate footballers in Kazakhstan
Uzbekistani expatriate sportspeople in Kazakhstan
Expatriate footballers in Russia
Uzbekistani expatriate sportspeople in Russia
Pakhtakor Tashkent FK players
FC SKA Rostov-on-Don players
FC Dnipro players
FC Irtysh Pavlodar players
FK Dinamo Samarqand players
Soviet Top League players
Soviet First League players
Association football forwards
Association football midfielders